Vukcevich is a surname, an American form of a surname . Notable people with the surname include:

 Milan Vukcevich (1937–2003), Serbian-American scientist, chess player, and writer
 Ray Vukcevich (born 1946), American writer

See also
 Vukčević